Johan Peñaranda (born January 3, 2000) is an American professional soccer player who plays as a goalkeeper for USL League One club Northern Colorado Hailstorm.

Club career

Youth & College
Peñaranda attended Long Beach High School, also playing club soccer at the BW Gottschee academy for two-and-a-half seasons before joining the New York City FC academy, helping the youth side to a Generation adidas Cup win in 2017 and a USSDA title in 2018.

In 2018, Peñaranda attended the University of Pittsburgh to play college soccer. In two seasons with the Panthers, he made 20 appearances. Following the 2019 season, Peñaranda  opted to move to Miami, Florida to be closer to his family. He attended Florida International University and made seven appearances in 2021, following the cancelled 2020 season due to the COVID-19 pandemic.

Professional
In July 2021, Peñaranda signed his first professional contract with A.D. Municipal Santa Ana in the Segunda División de Costa Rica.

On February 1, 2022, it was announced that Peñaranda had signed with USL League One club Northern Colorado Hailstorm ahead of their inaugural season. He made his debut for the Hailstorm on May 18, 2022, starting in a 2–1 win at Charlotte Independence.

International
In 2018, Peñaranda made an appearance for the United States under-19 team in a friendly game against the Jamaica under-20 side.

References

2000 births
Living people
American soccer players
Association football goalkeepers
Expatriate footballers in Costa Rica
FIU Panthers men's soccer players
Northern Colorado Hailstorm FC players
Pittsburgh Panthers men's soccer players
Segunda División de Costa Rica players
Soccer players from New York (state)
United States men's youth international soccer players
USL League One players